Swimming was contested at the inaugural 1951 Asian Games in National Stadium Swimming Pool, New Delhi, India from March 5 to March 7, 1951 with eight events all for men. 

Singapore was the most successful team in this event. Neo Chwee Kok of Singapore dominated the competition by winning four gold medals.

Medalists

Medal table

References 

 Sports 123: Asian Games

External links 
 First Asian Games New Delhi 1951

 
1951 Asian Games events
1951
Asian Games
1951 Asian Games